Tom Saintfiet (born 29 March 1973) is a Belgian football coach and former player. He was appointed as manager of the Gambian national team in July 2018.

Coaching career
Saintfiet has coached in several countries, including Belgium, Qatar, Germany, Faroe Islands, Finland, Jordan and the Netherlands. He has also worked in Africa, having been the head coach of the national teams of Namibia, Zimbabwe, Ethiopia, Malawi and Togo, among others. Saintfiet was manager of Finnish Premier League club RoPS Rovaniemi. In 2002, he coached Faroese team B71 and finished second in the Faroe Islands First Division. He then became coach at Al-Ittihad Sports Club in Qatar (now called Al-Gharafa Sports Club). In 2004, he coached the Qatar national under-17 football team to third place in the AFC U-17 Championship, qualifying for the FIFA U-17 World Cup in the process. Prior to the 2010 FIFA World Cup, Saintfiet was one of the candidates to lead the Nigerian national team for the World Cup campaign in South Africa. He would be named as the team's technical director in 2012 and became a candidate for the head coach position again in 2016.

Namibia
Saintfiet started off successfully with Namibia by beating Comoros and Malawi and playing a draw against Lesotho in the COSAFA Senior Challenge Cup in South Africa in July 2008. Namibia were eliminated in the quarter-final at the hands of eventual champion and host South Africa. Saintfiet's achievements with Namibia include defeating Zimbabwe 4–2 in a 2010 FIFA World Cup qualifier and DR Congo 4–0 in a friendly. Three days after a 1–1 away draw against Lebanon in April 2009, Namibia once again got an impressive result with a 0–0 draw away to Angola. However, perhaps his most impressive result came in Durban, when Namibia drew 1–1 with South Africa after leading for much of the game. Namibia had only won 1 game out of 12 in the months before Saintfiet's arrival. Under his leadership, Namibia rose 34 places in the FIFA World Rankings to the highest position they had achieved in the past 10 years. After these performances, the Namibian press nicknamed Saintfiet "The Saint" and one newspaper even called him "The Messiah".

Zimbabwe
After being heavily linked with the job, Sainfiet emerged successful through a shortlist of 15 candidates and signed a four-year contract with the Zimbabwe Football Association on 1 October 2010. In November, Zimbabwean immigration authorities refused to issue a work permit to the "Warriors" coach and Saintfiet was requested to leave. The Zimbabwe Football Association (ZIFA) then appealed the decision taken by the department of immigration to turn down Saintfiet's work permit application for national team coach. On 10 October, Zimbabwe played Cape Verde in Harare in a 2012 Africa Cup of Nations qualification match, with the game resulting in a 1–1 draw. Saintfiet had trained the squad prior to the match although he was made to leave the camp due to the issues regarding work permits. From his base in Namibia, Saintfiet put in place the tactics and selected the national team squad that beat Mozambique 3–1 in the following match. After being refused a work permit by the immigration department for a second time, he was forced to leave his role as head coach of Zimbabwe in October 2010. Former Manchester City player Benjani Mwaruwari announced his international retirement immediately after Saintfiet was forced out of the country.

Shabab Al Ordon
In late December 2010, Saintfiet signed a four-month contract with 2007 AFC Cup winners Shabab Al Ordon. Saintfiet displayed again a well-organized defense, with his team only conceding one goal in the first five matches with him in charge. He never lost a match with the club and guided them to second position in the national championship.

Ethiopia
Saintfiet was named head coach of Ethiopia in late May 2011. Within 10 days of taking over, he guided the Ethiopia national football team, composed of local players, to a 2–2 draw against Nigeria in the 2012 AFCON qualifiers. In a full Addis Ababa Stadium, fans watched Ethiopia take the lead for most of the game, only for Nigeria captain Joseph Yobo to score in the 86th minute to rescue a point. After beating Madagascar 4–2 Saintfiet voluntarily resigned his position as head coach on 28 October 2011 citing disagreements with the FA.

Nigeria
In March 2012, Saintfiet was appointed as the technical director of Nigeria by the Nigeria Football Federation (NFF). However, the Nigerian ministry of sports hinted three months later that there were many competent Nigerians and preferred a Nigerian instead of a foreign technical director. Therefore, he could not obtain a work visa to enter Nigeria.

Young Africans SC
In July 2012, Saintfiet took charge of Tanzania club Young Africans SC. He immediately guided the club to win the 2012 CECAFA Club Cup/Kagame Interclub Cup, the club's fifth Champions League of East and Central Africa. It was also the first time the club won the trophy two consecutive times. He was however let go in September after two league games because of a disagreement with the club board. Saintfiet guided the team in 16 matches, with 13 wins, 1 draw and 2 losses before he left.

Yemen, Malawi and Free State Stars
Between 2012 and 2013, Saintfiet was in charge of the Yemen national football team. On 3 July 2013, he took over as the head coach of the Malawi national football team on a three-month deal. The goal was to qualify Malawi for the first time in history for the World Cup but he did not succeed. A lack of budget stopped both parties to extend the three-month deal into a long term contract. Two years later the FAM President stated in a BBC interview that their poor performances of the last two years (2014–2015) were a result of not signing Saintfiet earlier.

On 2 July 2014, he was named the head coach of South African side Free State Stars. The club had ended the previous season in fourteenth place in the national league. After ten league matches into the 2014–2015 season, Saintfiet got fired after a dispute with the technical director and son of the owner, Kootso Mokoena. At that moment the team was in eleventh place in the league, three points behind champion favorites Orlando Pirates and Bidvest Wits. In the months after his sacking the team dropped to relegation zone (16th place) only to be rescued in the last games.

Togo
Saintfiet signed a contract as the head coach of Togo in May 2015. His first match at the helm of the Togo national team, however, had been three months earlier against Mauritius (28 March), as interim. Saintfiet guided Togo towards qualification for the 2017 Africa Cup of Nations. He left Togo in April 2016. In the 14 months in charge of the "Sparrow Hawks" he worked under 3 different FA Presidents (and boards) and 2 different Ministers of Sport.

Bangladesh
Saintfiet signed a short three-month contract with Bangladesh in June 2016. The start of his tenure did not go well as Bangladesh lost 0–5 to Maldives in an international friendly, the biggest defeat in Saintfiet's career so far. But the team bounced back with a 0–0 home draw against the Bhutan national football team in a 2019 AFC Asian Cup qualification match. Saintfiet cited the lack of strikers in the team as a major concern.

Trinidad and Tobago
Saintfiet, who took up the position of head coach of Trinidad and Tobago on 7 December 2016 following the dismissal of Stephen Hart, tendered his resignation to the Trinidad and Tobago Football Association (TTFA) only 35 days later. In the four matches Trinidad and Tobago played with Saintfiet at the helm, the team lost 2–1 to Nicaragua and then defeated them 3–1. Trinidad and Tobago lost in extra-time to both Suriname and Haiti in a Caribbean playoff for the 2017 CONCACAF Gold Cup qualifiers. Saintfiet cited a lack of support as the reason for his departure in a statement he released. He could never use his best team, the games were played on non-FIFA dates and about 15 major players weren’t available for different reasons. He was forced to use mostly local based players but TTFA and the league did not accept his request to postpone the league for 2 weeks during the preparation and the play-offs. For this reason, Saintfiet could not even select his best local based players. This combined with TTFA ignoring his request for a professional qualified capable staff were the reason he resigned.

Malta
On 11 October 2017, Saintfiet was appointed head coach of the Malta national team, his first appointment to a European national side. His first game in charge was on 12 November 2017, a 3–0 defeat to Estonia. After just three games in charge and with reports that Saintfiet was one of the coaches who applied for the post as Cameroon head coach, the Malta Football Association terminated his contract.

Gambia
Saintfiet was appointed manager of the Gambian national team on 18 July 2018. He made his debut in a 1–1 draw against Algeria valid for the 2019 Africa Cup of Nations qualification. On 25 March 2021, Saintfiet made history with Gambia by qualifying the country for the Africa Cup of Nations for the first with a 1–0 victory over Angola in Bakau while also finishing as the top team in Group D.

Gambia joined the 2021 Africa Cup of Nations as the lowest-ranked team of the tournament as well as the lowest-ranked team ever to participate in AFCON. They debuted with a 1–0 win over Mauritania followed by a 1–1 draw to Mali. Gambia qualified for the round of 16 with a game to spare and on 20 January defeated Tunisia 1–0 in their final group match. They finished with the same points as Mali, which, however, won the group due to a better overall goal difference.

Gambia continued to impress in the round of 16, defeating Guinea 1–0 to advance to the quarter-finals of the tournament. After a goalless first half, Gambia lost 2–0 to host Cameroon in the quarter-final in Douala.

Honours
B71 Sandur
Faroe Islands First Division runner-up: 2002

Qatar U17
AFC U-17 Championship third place: 2004 
Qualification for the 2005 FIFA U-17 World Championship

Young Africans
CECAFA Club Cup/Kagame Interclub Cup: 2012

Individual
The Namibian Coach of the Year: 2008  
Most Famous Sport Celebrity (Informanté): 2008
Namibia Sport Commission Sports Awards Coach of the Year runner-up: 2009

References

External links

 Tom Saintfiet Interview

1973 births
Living people
Belgian football managers
Al-Gharafa SC managers
Belgian expatriate football managers
Ethiopia national football team managers
Expatriate football managers in Bangladesh
Expatriate football managers in Ethiopia
Expatriate football managers in Finland
Expatriate football managers in Germany
Expatriate football managers in Jordan
Expatriate football managers in Malawi
Expatriate football managers in Namibia
Expatriate football managers in Qatar
Expatriate football managers in Togo
Expatriate football managers in Yemen
Expatriate football managers in Zimbabwe
Expatriate soccer managers in South Africa
Free State Stars F.C. managers
K.F.C. Lommel S.K. players
Malawi national football team managers
Namibia national football team managers
People from Mol, Belgium
Rovaniemen Palloseura managers
Yemen national football team managers
Zimbabwe national football team managers
Gambia national football team managers
Expatriate football managers in the Gambia
Bangladesh national football team managers
Belgian expatriate sportspeople in the Gambia
Association football midfielders
Belgian footballers
BV Cloppenburg managers
Belgian expatriate sportspeople in Yemen
Belgian expatriate sportspeople in Qatar
Belgian expatriate sportspeople in Finland
Belgian expatriate sportspeople in Jordan
Belgian expatriate sportspeople in Namibia
Belgian expatriate sportspeople in Togo
Belgian expatriate sportspeople in South Africa
Belgian expatriate sportspeople in Zimbabwe
Belgian expatriate sportspeople in Bangladesh
Belgian expatriate sportspeople in Ethiopia
Belgian expatriate sportspeople in Malta
Belgian expatriate sportspeople in Malawi
Belgian expatriate sportspeople in Trinidad and Tobago
Footballers from Antwerp Province